The 1993–94 Segunda Divisão de Honra season was the fourth season of the competition and the 60th season of recognised second-tier football in Portugal.

Overview
The league was contested by 18 teams with FC Tirsense winning the championship and gaining promotion to the Primeira Divisão along with UD Leiria and GD Chaves. At the other end of the table Académico Viseu, Louletano DC and Leixões SC were relegated to the Segunda Divisão.

League standings

Footnotes

External links
 Portugal 1993/94 - RSSSF (Paulo Claro)
 Portuguese II Liga 1993/1994 - footballzz.co.uk

Portuguese Second Division seasons
Port
2